Luise Sumpf Greger (27 December 1862 – 25 January 1944) was a German composer and pianist.

Life 
Greger took lessons at five and at nine she played for the Tsar. She began composing at 11. While still in Berlin in the 1890s, Richard Strauss proclaimed her to be a composer. She continued composing into her seventies and in 1933-34 her musical Christmas fairytale "Goose Girl" was performed 13 times to much acclaim.  In 1944 Greger was euthanized by the Nazis among a transport of 400 women at Merxhausen Nazi Germany and her work was lost. Decades later her family found some of her lieder in a trunk and she has since been honored in many forums in Germany and the US. Some of her descendants are American and it was through her music they connected with their German family and the "Luise Greger International Women in Music Festival" started in Langley, on Whidbey Island, WA, celebrating her works and those other talented local and international female composers from Washington state.  The “father of Langley” Jacob Anthes was from Hesse, the state where Grefer lived and performed in the “Garden City” of Kassel, now a UNESCO heritage site.

Compositions 
In her lifetime, Luise Greger received great recognition as a chamber singer and songwriter in her home country of Germany and throughout Europe, but her work and life are barely recognised today.

References

External links 
 

German women composers
Aktion T4 victims
1862 births
1944 deaths
19th-century German composers
20th-century German composers